Rainbow (stylized as RINBOW) is the fifth studio album by Japanese recording artist Ayumi Hamasaki, released on 18 December 2002 by Avex Trax. Production of Rainbow had commenced after the release of Hamasaki's fourth studio album I Am... that January; All lyrics were written by Hamasaki, and Japanese producer Max Matsuura returned to produce the album. The album was Hamasaki's first to feature conversational English lyrics, where in her previous works she had only used single words.

Channelling pop and trip hop music, Rainbow focuses on lighter themes that were established on her previous album. Some songs focus on loneliness, sadness and relationships, while the rest talk about happiness, having fun and nostalgia. Critics' opinions of the album were generally favourable; the composition and lyrical content were commended. However, some critics dismissed Hamasaki's vocals and Matsuura's production. Upon its release, the album entered the Oricon Albums Chart at number one with first week sales of over one million units, becoming her fifth album to reach the top spot, her fourth to debut there, and her fourth to sell over one million copies in its debut week.  Rainbow is the eighty-ninth highest selling Japanese album of all time.

Hamasaki promoted the album by releasing three singles: "Free & Easy", "H", and "Voyage". All three reached number one, with Free & Easy becoming the first of a record breaking twenty-five consecutive number one singles, a streak that did not break until 2013, when her single "Feel the Love/Merry-Go-Round" stalled at number five. All of the singles except "H" were accompanied by a short music video. Hamasaki performed several tracks from the album in several television appearances in 2002 and 2003, and has performed some of the album's songs on several concert tours and countdown live shows.

Background
On New Year's Day 2002, Hamasaki released her fourth studio album I Am... on Avex Trax. The album saw a new direction for Hamasaki, whose first three studio albums were dominated by a pop rock sound, and lyrics based on loneliness, confusion, sadness, relationships and individualism. The result was not generally well received by critics, who found Hamasaki's artistry "unassuming", particularly on her debut release A Song for ×× (1999). After being affected emotionally by the September 11 attacks, Hamasaki quickly changed the planned music direction for I Am..., and updated the album cover to support world peace. The album was Hamasaki's first to focus on lighter themes, such as faith, humanity and serenity. I Am... became a success and sold over 2.3 million copies in Japan, and was certified triple million by the RIAJ.

Composition

The lyrics to the tracks from Rainbow are written by Hamasaki. While promoting I Am..., Hamasaki performed for the first time outside Japan at the 2002 MTV Asia Music Awards in Singapore. Her performance has been seem as an influencing factor for Japanese musical acts to begin performing overseas. At the ceremony, Hamasaki felt that by only writing Japanese lyrics, she was not able to bring her "message" to other countries and decided to begin writing in English. Rainbow contains three songs with English lyrics: "Real Me", "Heartplace" and "Over". Like her previous album, Hamasaki focused on balancing lighter and darker themes for the album content; several tracks on the album talk about happiness, loneliness, nostalgia, love, and fun experiences. Japanese producer Max Matsuura returned as the album's primary producer. All songs were recorded in Japan through March to November 2002, and were mastered by Shigeo Miyamoto at FLAIR.

The introduction, "Everlasting Dream", is an instrumental piece. Composer CMJK said he was inspired by a phrase he used in creating the song, which was “No rain, no rainbow … If it doesn't rain (heartache), you won't see a rainbow (beauty and happiness).” Lyrics were written for the song, but were removed in the final piece. "We Wish" is an uptempo pop rock song. "We Wish" was the original title for the album, but Hamasaki felt that it didn't work well. The third track "Real Me", which is the first song to feature English-language phrases, is a string-based R&B song that was compared to the work of American recording artist Aaliyah. The lyrics to "Real Me" deal with feminism and female empowerment. "Free & Easy" incorporates instrumentations of horns and flutes, utilizing a soft and “airy” sound. "Heartplace" is an electronic rock song. The original version was straightforward hard rock sounds, but when Hamasaki added English lyrics, she felt it needed to be re-composed. 

Both "Over" and "Hanabi" are trip hop songs that showcase higher notes performed by Hamasaki, with the first dealing with friendships and the latter discussing nostalgia. After the “magical” instrumental "Taskinillusion", the ninth track "Everywhere Nowhere" is inspired by uptempo 80s-inspired dance-rock music. The lyrical content deals with social activity. The tenth track "July 1st" is a “summery” dance-pop song. The title was inspired by a party she attended a day before, highlighting how fireworks from America's independence day on July 4 reflected the mood and sensation she was in. The lyrics are about fun experiences with friends.

The mid-tempo trip hop "Dolls" was inspired by an unnamed film by Japanese director Takeshi Kitano. The trip hop inspired instrumental piece "Neverending Dreams" leads on from "Everlasting Dream". "Voyage" talks about the equality between women and men. The composition of "Close to You" is inspired by Christmas music, and the final track "Independent" is an uptempo pop rock song that relates to the theme of independence. A hidden track "+" was used at the end of "Independent".

Singles
The album's lead single "Free & Easy" was released on 24 April 2002. The song received positive reviews from music critics, who highlighted it as an album stand out. The song was a success in Japan, reaching number one and was certified platinum by RIAJ for shipments of 400,000 units. Wataru Takeishi commissioned the music video, which features Hamasaki and was inspired by Joan of Arc.

The album's second single was released as an extended play, and featured the tracks "Independent", "July 1st" and "Hanabi"; it was titled "H". Released on 24 July 2002, it received positive reviews from music critics, who highlighted the song's production and composition. The song reached number one on the Oricon Singles Chart and was certified million by RIAJ, and it remains was her final million-certified single to date. It occupied the top spot on the 2002 Annual Oricon Singles Chart, Hamasaki's first and only single to achieve this.  The song "Hanabi" was a commercially successful sleeper hit, being certified gold by the Recording Industry Association of Japan in January 2015, for selling 100,000 legal downloads since its release twelve and a half years prior.

The album's third and final single "Voyage" was released on 26 September 2002. It received positive reviews from music critics, who commended the composition and lyrical content. It reached number one on the Oricon Singles Chart and was certified triple platinum by RIAJ, her highest selling single underneath the million threshold. A short film was directed by Isao Yukisada and featured Hamasaki as a Japanese princess. The DVD was released and featured the video. All her singles from Rainbow were awarded Song(s) of the Year at the 2003 Japan Gold Disc Awards.

Promotion
Several tracks from Rainbow appeared as remixed versions on her 2003 compilation series: Rmx Works from Ayu-mi-x 5 Non-Stop Mega Mix, Rmx Works from Cyber Trance Presents Ayu Trance 3, and Rmx Works from Super Eurobeat Presents Ayu-ro Mix 3. To promote Rainbow, Hamasaki performed on several tours and concert shows; the first was her Ayumi Hamasaki Arena Tour 2002 A. She also promoted the album on her Ayumi Hamasaki Stadium Tour 2002 A, Ayumi Hamasaki Countdown Live 2002–2003 A and Ayumi Hamasaki Arena Tour 2003–2004 A, and her music videos for "Free & Easy", "Voyage" and other album promotional footage were featured on her 2004 video box set Ayumi Hamasaki Complete Clip Box A.

Release and critical reception

Rainbow was released on 18 December 2002 by Avex Trax. It was released in Taiwan by Avex Taiwan and in China by Avex and the China Record Shanghai Corporation (CRSC). The promotional photography, directed by Shinichi Hara and photographed by Leslie Kee, features a blue-hued Hamasaki sitting in water with rainbow-colored extensions in her hair; her name and the album title is featured at the bottom. Hara has been Hamasaki's creative director for promotional work and began collaborating with her in 1998. His final work was directing the sleeve for Hamasaki's 2009 single "Sunrise/Sunset (Love Is All)". A DVD of Rainbow was released in Japan in early 2003.

Rainbow received favorable reviews from most music critics. Rainbow was the first written review for Hamasaki by American journalist Adam Greenberg for AllMusic. Awarding it three-and-a-half stars out of five, he commented that “Rainbow came after a string of high-charting albums, itself not reaching the same heights thanks to some interesting but uneven experimentation with her sound.” Although he criticized the production and certain fillers, he concluded “The album doesn't have as much refinement as much of Hamasaki's later albums, but it shows the progression of her skills and vocal abilities.” He listed Rainbow as one of Hamasaki's best albums, alongside Secret (2005) and Ayu-mi-x 6: Silver (2008).

Commercial performance
Rainbow entered at number one on the Oricon Albums Chart selling over one million copies in its first week. It stayed at number one for a sole week, and stayed on the charts for twenty-seven weeks. Selling over 1.8 million units in Japan, the album was certified million by the Recording Industry Association of Japan (RIAJ) for shipments of one million units. The DVD edition entered at number 220 on the Oricon Albums Chart, and stayed in for just one week.

Rainbow is Hamasaki's fifth highest selling studio album according to Oricon; the DVD version is her fifty-third best selling album. The album is currently the eighty-ninth best selling Japanese album of all time, with total sales of 1.85 million units in Japan.

Track listing

Personnel 
Recording – Hiroyuki Shiotsuki, Koji Morimoto, Motohiro Tsuji, Satoshi Kumasaka, Yasuo Matsumoto, Yoichiro Kano, Yuichi Nagayama
Mastering – Shigeo Miyamoto
Directed by – Yasuyuki Tomita
Mixing – CMJK (1), HΛL (3) (12), Koji Morimoto (6, 9, 10, 11, 14), Satoshi Kumasaka (1, 8), Yasuo Matsumoto (2, 4, 5, 7, 13, 15), Yoshiaki Onishi (3)
Programming – CMJK (1, 3, 7), HΛL (2, 4, 11, 12), Tasuku (5, 8, 9, 10, 15), Atsushi Sato & Toshiharu Umesaki (6), Takahiro Iida & Yoshinori Kadoya (13), Nobuhiko Nakayama (14)
Guitar – Takehito Shimizu (2, 4, 6, 12), CMJK (3, 7, 9), Masato Ishinari (3), Tasuku (5, 8, 10), Yozo Nakatsugawa (5), Norihiro Ishizuka (9), Susumu Nishikawa (10), Hirokazu Ogura (13)
Strings – Gen Ittetsu Group (5, 13), Yuko Kajitani, Miyuki Onuma (11)
Strings arrangement – Ken Shima (5, 13), Yuta Nakano (11)
Backing vocals – Junko Hirotani (7, 13, 14), Andrea L. Hopkins, Daniel Morgan, Yasuhiro Kido (13), Kayoko Wada, Takao Saito (14)

Charts
Oricon Sales Chart (Japan)

 Total sales: 1,920,000 (Japan)
 Total sales: 2,440,000 (Avex)

Certifications

Release history

Notes

References

2002 albums
Ayumi Hamasaki albums
Avex Group albums
Japanese-language albums